Nisha K Nayar is a British actress. After coming to prominence in the 1993 film Bhaji on the Beach, she had starring roles as Debra Kumar in the film Out of Hours in 1998  and as Elaine "the Pain" Boyak in the CBBC children's series, The Story of Tracy Beaker from 2002 to 2005. She also appeared as Joyce Hammond in the ITV crime drama Rose and Maloney between 2004 and 2005 and starred as Fran Keeley in the Channel 4 drama Before We Die in 2021.

Life and career
Nisha K. Nayar was born in Great Oyster Bay, Dar es Salaam, Tanzania before her family relocated to Toronto, Canada when Nayar was six years old.  Her family then relocated again to the United Kingdom, and Nayar grew up in St Albans, Hertfordshire, England and later trained at The Anna Scher Theatre School.

Nayar made her acting debut in 1987, in the BBC sci-fi television programme Doctor Who in which she played the uncredited role of Red Kang. In 1991, Nayar appeared in her first major stage role in Our Own Kind. Nayar appeared as a nurse in an episode of Full Stretch, before landing the role of Ladhu in the film Bhaji on the Beach directed by Gurinder Chadha. The same year, she appeared as Jamila in 4 episodes of The Buddha of Suburbia. In 1994, she appeared in Medics as Jawinder and played the role of Shanti in the BBC mini-series Siren Spirits. In 1995, Nayar appeared in 2 episodes of Cone Zone as Jess, and played Nasreen in Cardiac Arrest. In 1996, she played Angela in the film Different for Girls, Olive in My Wonderful Life and Shaila in 4 episodes of London Bridge. In 1997, Nayar portrayed Tina in the film Sixth Happiness and in an episode of Holding On as Karen. She starred as Debra Kumar in the BBC medical drama series, Out of Hours in 1998. Between 1999 and 2001, she appeared as Stephanie in Big Bad World.

In 2002, Nayar began starring as Elaine Boyak in the CBBC series The Story of Tracy Beaker, based on the Jacqueline Wilson book of the same name. Elaine was introduced in the first series as the social worker of the title character, Tracy Beaker (Dani Harmer). Her nature earned her the nickname "Elaine the Pain" from the children in care and staff alike. Nayar appeared as a main character in all five series of the show and made her final appearance in the last episode in 2005. She also appeared as Elaine in Tracy Beaker: The Movie of Me and the Children in Need special Tracy Beaker Parties with Pudsey in 2004. Between 2004 and 2005, Nayar appeared as Joyce Hammond in the ITV crime drama series Rose and Maloney starring Sarah Lancashire and Phil Davis. In 2005, Nayar appeared in two episodes of Doctor Who, Bad Wolf and The Parting of Ways, portraying a female programmer who is exterminated by the Daleks. Nayar is also a voice-over artist and has provided voice over work for various television commercials including Deezer, Nivea, Heinz and Dove. She has also narrated various stories on podcasts and radio. She has also starred in audio plays including The Jungle Book.

In September 2017, Nayar appeared as Samira Kohli in the medical soap opera Doctors on a recurring basis. In 2019 she appeared as Dr. Rahael Malik in The Bay. In 2021, Nayar starred in the Channel 4 drama Before We Die as Fran Keeley. Nayar also made a cameo appearance as Elaine Boyak in the music video for "Someday" by Keisha White, the theme song for My Mum Tracy Beaker.

Filmography

References

External links
 

Living people
English television actresses
English film actresses
Tanzanian emigrants to Canada
Tanzanian emigrants to the United Kingdom
Year of birth missing (living people)